Supreme commander is a title given to a person who controls and runs a militant, insurgent or terrorist organization, especially in South Asia.

The title is often used for the head of a supreme council in many organizations, such as Tehrik-i-Taliban.

See also 
 Mullah Mohammed Omar
 Osama bin Laden
 Taliban
 Tehrik-e-Taliban leadership
 Al-Qaeda
 Sri Lankan Tamil nationalism
 Al-Shabaab (militant group)
 Abdul Rauf Asghar
 Ahmad Massoud

References 

Terrorism in Pakistan
Terrorism in Afghanistan
Terrorism in Sri Lanka
Organizations based in Asia designated as terrorist
Rebel groups in Pakistan
Rebel groups in Afghanistan